The 1981–82 Whitbread Round the World Race was the third edition of the around-the-world sailing event Whitbread Round the World Race. On 29 August 1981, 29 boats started out from Southampton for the Whitbread Round the World Race.

The maxi yacht Flyer II was designed by Germán Frers and built at the W. Huisman shipyard in 1981 for skipper Cornelius van Rietschoten. In an unusual feat, she won the race both on line honours and on handicap. Only 20 finished the race out of the 29 that started it.

Legs

Results

References

The Ocean Race
Whitbread Round The World Race, 1981-82
Whitbread Round The World Race, 1981-82
1982 in New Zealand sport